Eternamente ora is the second studio album by Italian singer-songwriter Francesco Gabbani. It was released in Italy through BMG Rights Management on the 12 February 2016. The album reached number 18 on the Italian Albums Chart. The album includes the singles "Amen", "Eternamente ora" and "In equilibrio".

Singles
"Amen" was released as the lead single from the album on 27 November 2015. The song reached number 14 on the Italian Singles Chart. "Eternamente ora" was released as the second single from the album on 6 May 2016. "In equilibrio" was released as the third single from the album on 12 September 2016.

Track listing

Charts

Weekly charts

Release history

References

2016 albums
Francesco Gabbani albums